Wang E (1465? – 1545) was an imperial landscape painter during the Ming Dynasty.

Wang E, style name 'Tingzhi' (廷直), was born in Fenghua, Zhejiang. He studied under Xiao Feng and later he served the Hongzhi Emperor. The emperor praised him as the Ma Yuan of his day (今之馬遠). Among the paintings of his that can be definitively dated, two were for Japanese envoys. He later retired to teaching and died at age 80.

Web sources 

1465 births
1545 deaths
Artists from Ningbo
Ming dynasty landscape painters
Painters from Zhejiang